Wissous is a commune in the Essonne department in Île-de-France in northern France. Paris-Orly Airport is partially located in the commune.

Population
Inhabitants of Wissous are known as Wissoussiens.

History

Wissous appears in an 11th-century French manuscript as a town called "Vizoor." The first mayor of Wissous was elected in 1790. Wissous experienced significant development since the beginning of the 20th century, with its population increasing by eightfold from 1900 to 2011.

Location
Wissous is located in the Longboyau plain, between the valleys of the Bièvre, the Orge, the Seine, and the Yvette.

Economy
OpenSkies, an airline, is headquartered in Paray Vieille Poste, near Wissous. Prior to its re-establishment as OpenSkies, the airline L'Avion (Elysair SAS) was headquartered in that location. Kyocera Fineceramics Group has its design centre in Orlytech in Paray-Vieille-Poste, near Wissous.

Education
Schools in Wissous include:
Groupe scolaire Victor-Baloche (combined elementary school and preschool)
Ecole maternelle La Fontaine (preschool)
Ecole élémentaire La Fontaine

The commune includes a library.

Coat of arms and logo

The coat of arms contains three fleurs de lys, symbolizing Ile-de-France, on an azure background. On a red background, there are six ears of corn, which represent the agricultural activity in the commune. Each two ears have one gear underneath; the gears represent the importance of economic activity. The commune's logo, placed on official documents, has one fleur de lys, one gear, and one ear of corn.

See also

Communes of the Essonne department

References

External links

Official website 

Mayors of Essonne Association 

Communes of Essonne
Essonne communes articles needing translation from French Wikipedia